Pheniprazine (INN; also known as amphethydrazine and amphetamine hydrazide; brand names Catron and Cavodil; codename JB-516) is an irreversible and nonselective monoamine oxidase inhibitor (MAOI) of the hydrazine chemical class that was used as an antidepressant in the 1960s. It was also used in the treatment of angina pectoris and schizophrenia. Pheniprazine has been largely discontinued due to toxicity concerns such as jaundice, amblyopia, and optic neuritis.

See also 
 Hydrazine (antidepressant)

References 

Hepatotoxins
Hydrazines
Monoamine oxidase inhibitors
Withdrawn drugs
Phenethylamines